Mangrol State was a princely state in the Junagadh district of Gujarat, India. It was incorporated into Saurashtra State in 1949 following a referendum which determined to join India rather than Pakistan.

References

Junagadh
Princely states of Gujarat